The Tajikistan Fed Cup team represents Tajikistan in Fed Cup tennis competition and are governed by the National Tennis Federation of the Republic of Tajikistan.  They have not competed since 2017.

History
Tajikistan competed in its first Fed Cup in 1998.  Their best result was finishing third in Group II on three occasions.

Players

See also
Fed Cup
Tajikistan Davis Cup team

External links

Billie Jean King Cup teams
Fed Cup
Fed Cup